Howell Meadors Henry (August 18, 1879 - 1956) was a history professor, dean, and author in the United States. He wrote The Police Control of the Slave in South Carolina. He was a segregationist and held discriminatory views of African Americans.

He received a B.A. from Newberry College, an M.A. from Vanderbilt University in 1908, and a Phd from Vanderbilt in 1913. He was a history professor and dean at Emory & Henry College in Emory, Virginia. He was involved in discussions over intercollegiate athletics at the college.

He married and had sons.

References

1879 births
1956 deaths
Newberry College alumni
Emory and Henry College faculty
Vanderbilt University alumni
20th-century American historians
American university and college faculty deans